Ilias Nikas (born 16 April 1964) is a Greek judoka. He competed in the men's half-heavyweight event at the 1992 Summer Olympics.

References

1964 births
Living people
Greek male judoka
Olympic judoka of Greece
Judoka at the 1992 Summer Olympics
Sportspeople from Athens
20th-century Greek people